Anadesmoceras is an hoplitid ammonite from the lower Albian (upper Lower Cretaceous) of England, included in the subfamily Cleoniceratinae. Anadesmoceras has a shell shaped more or less like a compressed Cleoniceras but with faint ornament only on the inner whorls. The shell has bundled growth striae. The aperture is preceded by several wide sinuous constrictions.

References

Mesozoic Ammonoidea, Arkell et al; Treatise on Invertebrate Paleontology, Part L. p. L394.

Early Cretaceous ammonites of Europe